

Administrative and municipal divisions

References

Novosibirsk Oblast
Novosibirsk Oblast